I Am the New Black is a 2009 autobiography by American actor and comedian Tracy Morgan, co-written with journalist Anthony Bozza. It was published on 22 October 2009 by Spiegel & Grau.

The book includes tales about Morgan's life as a child, living in Tompkins Projects in Brooklyn, the desperation of the drug dealers' trade and how he rose to fame performing on Saturday Night Live.

References

2009 non-fiction books
Show business memoirs
Spiegel & Grau books